Red Thunder is a 2003 science fiction novel by American writer John Varley. The novel is an homage to the juvenile science fiction novels written by Robert A. Heinlein.

In 2004, Red Thunder won the Endeavour Award and was nominated for the Campbell Award.

Varley has written three sequels, Red Lightning (2006), Rolling Thunder (2008) and Dark Lightning (2014). The events of the books in the series are set approximately twenty years apart. In an interview on the Republibot website in 2009 he mentioned that "Dark Lightning" would be the final book in the series.

Synopsis

The novel begins in Florida in the near future. China and the United States are sending competing first missions to Mars, although it is clear the Chinese will arrive first. The book's protagonist is Manny Garcia, a teenager who is fascinated by space flight. He, along with his girlfriend Kelly, his best friend Dak, and Dak's girlfriend Alicia, are partying on the beach one night and almost run over a man who has passed out from drinking. The man is Travis Broussard, a former astronaut who was forced to retire in disgrace. Travis lives with his cousin Jubal, who is mentally deficient in some ways, but is also a scientific genius.

Jubal has invented a device called the "squeezer", a spherical impenetrable silver force field that can be formed or have its size changed with no cost of energy. Thus, the squeezer can compress whatever matter is within it to an arbitrarily small volume and then vent the resulting plasma/energy in a controlled way. Travis and the teenagers realize the device has numerous practical uses, but it is also a dangerous weapon. They decide to use the squeezers to power a spaceship and plan to arrive at Mars ahead of the slower traveling American and Chinese missions already in transit, and to be available should Jubal's prediction of problems with the American drive prove true.

They succeed in building the Red Thunder out of used railroad tank cars on schedule, and near their shoestring budget of $1 million and take off. The four teenagers form the crew with Travis as pilot. They arrive at Mars a day ahead of the Chinese mission. They learn from the Chinese that the American mission was stranded by an accident (their VASIMR drive exploded).  Red Thunder is able to locate and rescue the surviving crew members during their return to Earth.

When they arrive back on Earth, they are heroes. They use the publicity of their trip to ensure that no nation or individual controls the squeezer technology, and help form a separate non-political organization to control and disseminate the new technology. With this new technology, people are able to eliminate waste dumps and pollution, and begin a new era of space travel throughout the solar system and beyond.

References

External links
Red Thunder at Worlds Without End

2003 American novels
2003 science fiction novels
American science fiction novels
Novels set on Mars
Novels set in Florida